The 2008 Pan-Pacific Championship is the inaugural edition of the Pan-Pacific Championship association football competition which took place on February 20 and February 23 in Honolulu, Hawaii, featuring teams from Japan's J. League, United States Major League Soccer (MLS) and the A-League of Australia and New Zealand.

For the 2008 tournament, the A-League was not represented by the champion team but instead by the loser of the minor semi-final.  This is due to a scheduling conflict with the Grand Final on February 24, which was moved back so as not to interfere with Australia's 2010 FIFA World Cup qualification campaign.

The 2008 tournament also features Gamba Osaka of the J. League, which were the 2007 J. League Cup champion, and Major League Soccer representatives Houston Dynamo and Los Angeles Galaxy, the latter reportedly chosen instead of the desired 2007 SuperLiga champion, as Pachuca declined and Galaxy were the Superliga runner-up. The Galaxy's first game was versus Gamba Osaka. while the Dynamo were drawn against Sydney FC.

All matches were played at Aloha Stadium in Honolulu, Hawaii.

Bracket

Semifinals

Third-place match

Final

Top scorers

Sponsors
The following is a list of the official sponsors of the Pan-Pacific Championship 2008.
MLJ
Hilton Hawaiian Village Beach Resort & Spa on Waikiki Beach
Onkyo
The Honolulu Advertiser
Japan Airlines
Yamazaki-Nabisco
Active Hawaii
Johnson & Johnson

References

Pan-Pacific Championship
Soccer in Hawaii
2008
2008
2008 in sports in Hawaii
Pan
Pan

nl:Pan-Pacific Championship 2008